The Patient Ombudsman is an ombudsman office which acts as a neutral body of last resort for complaints about the healthcare system in Ontario, Canada. The Patient Ombudsman has jurisdiction over public hospitals and long-term care homes, as well as home and community care coordinated by the Local Health Integration Networks (LHINs).

The position was created in 2015 through amendments to the Excellent Care for All Act. Unlike the Ontario Ombudsman, the Patient Ombudsman is not an independent officer of the Legislative Assembly of Ontario; the Patient Ombudsman's office is under the jurisdiction of the Ministry of Health's advisory agency Health Quality Ontario. 

In the office's first year, it received 2,000 complaints. The bulk of complaints were about Ontario's hospitals. The office received 2,300 complaints in its second year of operations.

Amid the COVID-19 pandemic in Ontario, Ombudsmen Cathy Fooks released a series of recommendations to deal with the pandemic in long-term care homes, such as better whistleblower protections, communications and visitation systems.

List of Patient Ombudspersons
 Christine Elliott (1 July 2016 – 1 February 2018)
 Craig Thompson (1 February 2018 – 12 July 2020), Executive Director managing day-to-day operations
 Cathy Fooks (13 July 2020 - December 2020), died in an accident shortly after appointment
Craig Thompson (29 March 2021 - present)

References

External links

2015 establishments in Ontario
Government agencies established in 2015
Politics of Ontario
Ombudsmen in Canada
Canada Patient Ombudsman